Season 1989–90 was the 106th football season in which Dumbarton competed at a Scottish national level, entering the Scottish Football League for the 84th time, the Scottish Cup for the 95th time and the Scottish League Cup for the 43rd time.

Overview 
Dumbarton attempted to recover from the failures in the previous couple of seasons and splashed out on the signing of striker Charlie Gibson.  There was an improvement in performances and by the beginning of December the club were 2nd in the league, but a combination of bad weather (which made the Boghead pitch unplayable for over 3 months) and bad discipline (resulting in suspensions of key players) meant that Dumbarton in the end had to settle for a 6th-place finish.

In the Scottish Cup, Dumbarton fell in the second round to fellow Second Division opponents Cowdenbeath.

In the League Cup, again it would be a second round exit, but there was no disgrace in the loss to Premier Division Celtic.

Locally, Dumbarton regained the Stirlingshire Cup with a final win over local rivals Clydebank.

Results & fixtures

Scottish Second Division

Skol Cup

Tennant's Scottish Cup

Stirlingshire Cup

Pre-season matches

League table

Player statistics

Squad 

|}

Transfers

Players in

Players out

Reserve team
Dumbarton competed in the Scottish Reserve League (West), and with 11 wins and 3 draws from 28 games, finished 12th of 15.

In the Reserve League Cup, Dumbarton lost out to Partick Thistle in the first round.

Trivia
 The £50,000 fee paid by Dumbarton to Stirling Albion for Charlie Gibson was a record in fees paid.
  The slight improvement in fortunes would not, however, be enough to save manager Jim George's position and with 3 games to go in the league, he was sacked, to make way for Billy Lamont's second stint at the job.

See also
 1989–90 in Scottish football

References

External links
Peter Wharton (Dumbarton Football Club Historical Archive)
Jim McGinlay (Dumbarton Football Club Historical Archive)
Paul McGrogan (Dumbarton Football Club Historical Archive)
Billy Reid (Dumbarton Football Club Historical Archive)
David Wilson (Dumbarton Football Club Historical Archive)
Scottish Football Historical Archive

Dumbarton F.C. seasons
Scottish football clubs 1989–90 season